Share the Land is the seventh studio album by Canadian rock band The Guess Who, released in October 1970. It was their first album following the departure of Randy Bachman, and the band brought in two new guitarists, Kurt Winter and Greg Leskiw. The album was another international success for the band, reaching number seven in Canada and number fourteen in the US, and spawned three hit singles in the title track, "Hand Me Down World" and "Hang On to Your Life".

Release history

In addition to the usual 2 channel stereo version a 4 channel quadraphonic mix was released by RCA on the 8-track tape format. The album was first released on CD by RCA Records in 1994, Share the Land was remastered and released on CD by Buddha Records in 2000, including two bonus tracks from post-American Woman sessions featuring Bachman, previously released on the 1976 collection The Way They Were.  In 2015, the album was again remastered, this time by Vic Anesini at Iconoclassic Records, including bonus tracks from the time period of the album’s initial release.

In 2019 the album was reissued again in the UK by Dutton Vocalion on the Super Audio CD format. This disc is a 2 albums on 1 disc compilation which also contains the 1970 Guess Who album American Woman. The Dutton Vocalion release contains the complete stereo and quad versions of both albums.

About the album
The album's music primarily consists of rock, blues and hard rock.
Five songs from the album, "Hand Me Down World", "Bus Rider", "Share the Land", "Do You Miss Me Darlin'?" and an edited single version of "Hang On to Your Life" (without the Psalm 22 excerpt that closes the album version) make up an entire side of the 1971 greatest hits compilation, The Best of The Guess Who.

"Hang On to Your Life" was written by Cummings supposedly after a bad case of sunburn, but many people believe it was written after a bad acid trip. It is an anti-drug song, and was used on commercials to promote stopping the usage of heavy drugs. At the end of the song, Psalm 22:13–15 is quoted. "Hand Me Down World" and "Bus Rider" were from Winter's band Brother, but The Guess Who recorded them before Brother had ever been into a studio.  On the 8-track tape edition of the album, the song was edited to make it a bit longer in order to fill out the timing on the first channel (a few extra measures appear before each verse).

Album cover
When asked how the band knew the Indigenous man on the album's cover, they replied, "central casting". In a 2016 interview with Relix, Burton Cummings was asked about the cover and stated:  Well, don’t forget that the biggest single album of The Guess Who’s career was Share The Land, which was the album that had the Chief of the American Cherokees on the cover. Everybody still thinks I’m native. I just thought that it was a great idea to do that, to put him on the cover. This guy was 81 years old, and we all scampered up a hill for the photo shoot, and he beat us to the top. This guy was crazy; snakes had bitten him something like a hundred times. This guy could bite a snake and kill it, he was 81 and had not a wrinkle on his face.

Reception
Bruce Eder of AllMusic says "Recorded in the immediate aftermath of lead guitarist Randy Bachman's departure from the group, Share the Land was a better album than anyone could rightfully have expected, and it was the biggest selling original album in their entire output, appearing in the wake of "American Woman" and lofted into the Top 20."

Share the Land peaked at number 14 on the Billboard 200 in November 1970.

Track listing
All songs written by Burton Cummings and Kurt Winter except noted.
Side one
 "Bus Rider" (Winter) – 2:57
 "Do You Miss Me Darlin'?" – 3:55
 "Hand Me Down World" (Winter) – 3:26
 "Moan for You Joe" (Cummings, Greg Leskiw) – 2:39
 "Share the Land" (Cummings) – 3:53
Side two
 "Hang On to Your Life" – 4:09
 "Coming Down Off the Money Bag" / "Song of the Dog" (Leskiw, Cummings) – 3:54
 "Three More Days" – 8:55

2000 Buddha re-issue bonus tracks
 "Palmyra" (Bachman, Cummings) – 5:44
 "The Answer" (Bachman, Cummings) – 4:05

2016 Iconoclassic re-issue bonus tracks
 "Runnin' Down the Street" (Kale, Peterson) – 4:20
"Hang On to Your Life" (Single Version) – 3:25
"Moan for You Joe" (Take 3) (Cummings, Leskiw) – 2:24

Personnel
The Guess Who
Burton Cummings – lead vocals, keyboards, flute on "Three More Days"
Kurt Winter – lead guitar, backing vocals, co-lead vocal on "Bus Rider"
Greg Leskiw – rhythm guitar, backing vocals, lead vocal on "Coming Down Off the Money Bag"
Jim Kale – bass, backing vocals 
Garry Peterson – drums, backing vocals, glockenspiel on "Do You Miss Me Darlin'"

Production
Brian Christian - engineer
Jack Richardson - producer

Charts
Album

Singles

References 

1970 albums
The Guess Who albums
Albums produced by Jack Richardson (record producer)
RCA Victor albums
Buddah Records albums